YHF may refer to:

  Hearst (René Fontaine) Municipal Airport in Ontario, Canada (IATA code)
 Yalda Hakim Foundation, a charitable organisation providing scholarships to Afghani women
 Yankee Hotel Foxtrot, 2001 album by American band Wilco